Thomas Crooke may refer to:

 Thomas Crooke (priest) (c. 1545–1598), English clergyman
 Sir Thomas Crooke, 1st Baronet (1574–1630), English-born politician, lawyer and landowner 
 Tom Crooke (1884–1929), American baseball player

See also
Thomas Crook (1798–1879), American politician
Thomas Crooks, football coach